is a train station on the Tenryū Hamanako Line in Kakegawa, Shizuoka Prefecture, Japan. It is 5.9 rail kilometers from the terminus of the line at Kakegawa Station.

Station history
Haranoya Station was established on April 17, 1935 as a station on the Japan National Railway Futamata line. Scheduled freight services were discontinued from August 1962. After the privatization of JNR on March 15, 1987, the station came under the control of the Tenryū Hamanako Line.

Lines
Tenryū Hamanako Railroad
Tenryū Hamanako Line

Layout
Haranoya Station has two opposed, elevated side platforms, and a small wooden station building.

Adjacent stations

|-
!colspan=5|Tenryū Hamanako Railroad

External links
  Tenryū Hamanako Railroad Station information	

Railway stations in Shizuoka Prefecture
Railway stations in Japan opened in 1935
Stations of Tenryū Hamanako Railroad